Akeem Jerome King (born August 29, 1992) is an American football cornerback who is a free agent. He played college football at San Jose State and was drafted by the Atlanta Falcons in the seventh round of the 2015 NFL Draft.

Early life and college playing career
Born in Visalia, California, King graduated from Nipomo High School in 2010. King lettered in football, track, and basketball at Nipomo High and played three offensive positions (fullback, wide receiver, and tight end) and two defensive positions (cornerback and linebacker). During track & field season, he set the Titans' school record for the 100-meter dash in 10.74 seconds.

In his senior season, King had 4 touchdowns, 30 tackles, and 2 interceptions. A two-star recruit, King attracted one offer from San Jose State. On January 17, 2010, King signed with San Jose State.

A two-star recruit, King attracted one offer from San Jose State. On January 17, 2010, King signed with San Jose State.

Initially recruited as a wide receiver in Mike MacIntyre's first recruiting class at San Jose State University, King redshirted his freshman season in 2010, then switched to safety. As a redshirt freshman in 2011, King played the final two games of the season on special teams.

In his sophomore season of 2012, King played eight games, including San Jose State's win in the 2012 Military Bowl, all on special teams.

King played all 11 games in the season as a junior in 2013. He began playing as a reserve defensive back in addition to special teams. King had 15 tackles on the season and defended two passes, both in San Jose State's season-ending upset of #16 Fresno State.

King completed his Bachelor of Arts degree in business marketing in May 2014 and was enrolled in San Jose State's Master of Business Administration program for his senior football season. King started all 12 games of 2014. He had 71 tackles, including 1.5 tackles for loss, and two passes defended. On November 21, King had a career-high 11 tackles against Utah State.

Professional career

Atlanta Falcons

King was selected by the Atlanta Falcons in the seventh round, 249th overall, in the 2015 NFL draft. On September 5, 2015, King was waived by the Falcons in the final cuts before the start of the regular season. On September 7, 2015, he was signed to the Falcons' practice squad. On November 6, 2015, he was elevated to the active roster.

On September 3, 2016, King was placed on injured reserve with a foot injury. In the 2016 season, the Falcons reached Super Bowl LI, but King did not get to participate due to his injury. The Falcons fell to the New England Patriots in a 34–28 overtime defeat.

On September 1, 2017, King was waived by the Falcons.

Seattle Seahawks
On September 13, 2017, King was signed to the Seattle Seahawks' practice squad. He re-signed with the Seahawks on March 16, 2018.

On September 1, 2018, King was waived by the Seahawks and was re-signed to the practice squad. He was promoted to the active roster on September 8, 2018.

Buffalo Bills
On August 2, 2020, King signed with the Buffalo Bills, but was released a week later.

Miami Dolphins
On December 2, 2020, King was signed to the Miami Dolphins' practice squad. His practice squad contract with the team expired after the season on January 11, 2021.

References

External links
 Atlanta Falcons bio
 San Jose State Spartans bio

1992 births
Living people
People from San Luis Obispo County, California
Players of American football from California
Sportspeople from Visalia, California
American football cornerbacks
American football safeties
San Jose State Spartans football players
Atlanta Falcons players
Seattle Seahawks players
Buffalo Bills players
Miami Dolphins players